Bert Mills (16 February 1910 – 6 May 1984) was an Australian rules footballer who played for and captained Hawthorn in the Victorian Football League (VFL).

Local brothers, Arthur Mills and Albert Mills played for Bethanga in the 1926  and 1927  Kiewa & District Football Association grand finals, before the family moved to Oxley, near Wangaratta, playing with Wangaratta Football Club in 1929, then both brothers made their debuts for the Hawthorn Football Club in 1930.

Bert Mills usually played as a ruckman but was also used at centre half-back. He captained Hawthorn at various times during his career, starting in 1932, then the 1934 and 1938 seasons before his final stint from 1940 until 1941 which was as both captain and coach.

Mills won the 1930 Most Consistent player award in his first season of VFL football.

During his time at Hawthorn he won their Best and Fairest award three times, in 1933, 1935 and 1939. Mills was also presented with a Hawthorn FC life membership medallion in 1939 too. He also represented Victoria in interstate football, doing so on 11 occasions.

In 1936, Mills won Hawthorn's "Best and Fairest" (Most Popular Player), which was sponsored by the Hoyts Palace Theatre, Glenferrie.

Mills was captain-coach of Hawthorn in 1940 and 1941.

He was named on the back pocket in Hawthorn's official 'Team of the Century'.

Bert was the younger brother of Hawthorn footballer Arthur Mills.

Honours and achievements
 3× Hawthorn best and fairest: 1933, 1935, 1939
 Hawthorn captain: 1932, 1934, 1938, 1940–1941
 Hawthorn Hall of Fame
 Hawthorn Team of the Century
 Hawthorn life member

References

External links

1929 - Wangaratta Football Club - team photo

1910 births
Australian rules footballers from Victoria (Australia)
Hawthorn Football Club players
Hawthorn Football Club coaches
Peter Crimmins Medal winners
1984 deaths